Darley or Darly may refer to:

Places

Australia
 Darley, Victoria, a suburb of Bacchus Marsh, Victoria

England
 Darley Abbey, a village in Derbyshire
 Darley Bridge, a bridge in Derbyshire
 Darley Dale, a town in Derbyshire (Darley Bridge is a suburb)
 Darley Moor Airfield, a motor racing circuit on a former RAF airfield in Derbyshire
 Darley, North Yorkshire, a village in Nidderdale, North Yorkshire, England (includes Darley Head)
 Darleyford, Cornwall, also known as Darley
 North Darley, Cornwall
 South Darley, Derbyshire

People 
 Arthur Warren Darley
 F. O. C. Darley, an illustrator who lived in the Darley House
 Frederick Matthew Darley, former Chief Justice of New South Wales
 George Darley
 John M. Darley (1938–2018), US-American social psychologist
 John Darley (Australian politician)
 John Richard Darley, Anglican bishop
 Julian Darley
 Thomas Darley who kept the Darley Arabian at stud
 Ward Darley
 Lise Darly
 Matthias Darly
 Darley George Boucicault, apparently an alias of Dion Boucicault
 Francesca Maria Steele (18481931), an English writer who used the pseudonym Darley Dale for her fiction.
 Darlie Routier, a woman on Texas death row
 Darley, goalkeeper for Feyenoord

Other
 the Darley Arabian, a horse named after Thomas Darley
 Darley Oaks Farm, a farm involved in animal rights campaigning
 Darley House, a historic house in Clayton, Delaware, USA
 Darley Stud, the global breeding operation owned by Sheikh Mohammed bin Rashid Al Maktoum
 Darley Racing, Thoroughbred horse racing stable
sponsors of the Darley Alcibiades Stakes, a horse race
 Darlie, a brand of toothpaste